Broadway by Light is a 1958 French-American experimental short film debut by the photographer William Klein.

Summary 
A documentary study of nighttime at Times Square and the bright-lighted advertising of Broadway.

Production 
Klein was encouraged by French New Wave filmmakers Alain Resnais and Chris Marker (the latter responsible for the text at the beginning of the film).

Reception and legacy 
The film's pop art style contrasts the usually gritty photography of Klein, which were taken during daylight, thus being called the first pop film.

It earned praise from master auteur Orson Welles.

References

External links 
 

1958 short films
Films directed by William Klein
1950s avant-garde and experimental films
American short documentary films
French short documentary films
Films set in New York City
Films without speech
1958 directorial debut films
1950s short documentary films
French avant-garde and experimental films
American avant-garde and experimental films